This is a list of settlements in the Ikaria regional unit''', Greece.

 Agios Kirykos
 Agios Polykarpos
 Arethousa
 Chrysostomos
 Dafni
 Evdilos
 Fournoi Korseon
 Frantato
 Karavostamo
 Karkinagri
 Manganitis
 Perdiki
 Raches

By municipality

Fournoi Korseon (no subdivisions)

See also
List of towns and villages of Greece

Ikaria